Ferkessédougou Department is a department of Tchologo Region in Savanes District, Ivory Coast. In 2021, its population was 190,141 and its seat is the settlement of Ferkessédougou. The sub-prefectures of the department are Ferkessédougou, Koumbala, and Togoniéré.

History

Ferkessédougou Department was created in 1969 as one of the 24 new departments that were created to take the place of the six departments that were being abolished. It was created from territory that was formerly part of Nord Department. Using current boundaries as a reference, from 1969 to 2008 the department occupied the same territory that is Tchologo Region.

In 1997, regions were introduced as new first-level subdivisions of Ivory Coast; as a result, all departments were converted into second-level subdivisions. Ferkessédougou Department was included as part of Savanes Region.

In 2008, Ferkessédougou Department was split to create Ouangolodougou Department.

In 2011, districts were introduced as new first-level subdivisions of Ivory Coast. At the same time, regions were reorganised and became second-level subdivisions and all departments were converted into third-level subdivisions. At this time, Ferkessédougou Department became part of Tchologo Region in Savanes District.

Frekessédougou Department was divided again in 2012, when three sub-prefectures were split-off to create Kong Department.

Notes

Departments of Tchologo
1969 establishments in Ivory Coast
States and territories established in 1969